Freethought Festival is a student-run freethinking convention held annually in Madison, Wisconsin by the student group Atheists, Humanists, and Agnostics at the University of Wisconsin–Madison. Speakers give talks relating to atheism, freethinking, skepticism, and other topics.

Description 
The Freethought Festival is a free, student-run secular conference held annually in Madison, Wisconsin. It is organized and hosted by Atheists, Humanists, and Agnostics (AHA) @ UW-Madison. Authors, bloggers, activists, and scientists from around the country come to speak on secular and scientific issues. The event is funded by AHA through an annual operations budget received from the University of Wisconsin-Madison.

Past Festivals

References

External links 
 Official Freethought Festival website

Festivals in Wisconsin
Freethought
University of Wisconsin–Madison